Amadori is a surname. Notable people with the name include:

Davide Amadori (born 1992), Italian footballer
Federico Cattani Amadori (1856–1943), Italian Cardinal of the Roman Catholic Church
Luis César Amadori (1902–1977), Italian - Argentine film director and screenwriter
Marino Amadori (born 1957), Italian former cyclist

See also
Amadori rearrangement, is an organic reaction